Xiao Yuyi (born 10 January 1996 in Shantou, Guangdong) is a Chinese international association football player who plays for the China women's national football team and Shanghai Shengli of the Chinese Women's Super League (CWSL).

Club career
In November 2022, Xiao was loaned to Australian club Adelaide United. In February 2023, she ended her loan early so she could have more opportunities to train with the national team ahead of the 2023 FIFA Women's World Cup.

International career
Xiao is seemed as the Miss Fortune of China women's national football team. At the second leg of Olympic qualifying against South Korea, she made an assist to equalize the score to 2–2. She also scored the winning goal in the 2022 AFC Women's Asian Cup Final against South Korea in injury time.

International goals

References

1996 births
Living people
Chinese women's footballers
Women's association football midfielders
China women's international footballers
Footballers at the 2018 Asian Games
Asian Games silver medalists for China
Asian Games medalists in football
Medalists at the 2018 Asian Games
Footballers at the 2020 Summer Olympics
Olympic footballers of China
Adelaide United FC (A-League Women) players